The list of fictional worms is categorized by media. The word "worm" includes earthworms, and mythological and fantastic creatures descending from the Old English word "wyrm", a poetic term for a legless serpent or dragon.

Mythology and legends
The Lambton Worm, of 15th-century English legend, also made into an opera by Robert Sherlaw Johnson.
The Worm of Sockburn, of 14th-century English legend.
The Worm of Linton, of 12th-century Scottish legend.
The Laidley Worm of Bamburgh.
The Mongolian Death Worm, a cryptozoological creature reported to exist in the Gobi Desert.
The Stoor worm, of Orcadian folklore.

Literature
The Lair of the White Worm is a 1911 novel by  Bram Stoker, made into a 1988 film by director Ken Russell.
 Fafnir, a beast slain during the course of the Völsungasaga, is a worm in William Morris's rendition.
The Worm Ouroboros, a 1922 fantasy novel by E. R. Eddison, invokes an ancient myth of a legless creature that eats its own tail.
"The Coming of the White Worm" is a 1941 short story by Clark Ashton Smith.
 J.R.R. Tolkien refers to his creation Glaurung as 'The Great Worm'. This term was adopted by hackers to describe the Morris Worm.
Also in Tolkien's The Hobbit, creatures called Wereworms are mentioned, although they don't appear in the book, nor in any other book of Tolkien. They appear, however, in Peter Jackson third film of Hobbit adaption.
 John Brunner's 1975 novel Shockwave Rider describes computer 'tapeworms' as capable of reproducing themselves as long as networked computers enable their survival.
"In the House of the Worm" is a 1976 short story by George R. R. Martin.
The Conqueror Worms is a 2006 novel by Brian Keene.
The 2016 children's novel Ricky Ricotta's Mighty Robot vs. the Naughty Nightcrawlers from Neptune features a wise worm named Nimrod Nightcrawler, who serves as the main antagonist of the book. He hates living on Neptune due to the methane gas blocking out the sun on the surface of the planet, and after seeing other evil geniuses from other planets that have failed to take over Earth, he decides to follow in their footsteps and take over Earth himself.
"The Worm of the World's End" is an apocalyptic being first mentioned in The One Tree, Book 2 of the second trilogy of The Chronicles of Thomas Covenant, the Unbeliever fantasy series written by Stephen R. Donaldson. Its slumbering body is said to underlie the land and ocean, and its thrashings will destroy the world when it awakes. By the end of the Second Chronicles one is left wondering if it really exists, or whether it is an allegory for the world's eventual fate. However the more recent books make it clear that the worm does exist, but that it is nowhere near as large as readers may have imagined. However, its hunger will nonetheless lead to global ruination.
 Sandworms play a major role in the science fiction novel Dune and in its film and TV adaptations (Dune universe).
Diary of a Worm (2003), written by Doreen Cronin and illustrated by Harry Bliss, is a journalistic account of a worm's daily life.
 Lowly Worm is a fictional character that makes frequent appearances in Richard Scarry's children's books.
 Flobberworms are dull, worm-like magical creatures in the Harry Potter universe.
 Molly Michon, aka Kendra, Warrior Babe of the Outland, worships a worm god known as Nigoth in several of Christopher Moore's novels, including The Stupidest Angel and The Lust Lizard of Melancholy Cove.
 César Aira's "The Literary Conference" (2010) features giant blue worms, the product of a science experiment gone awry, that destructively tumble down mountains toward the Venezuelan town below.
 Daniel Pinkwater's 1981 novel The Worms of Kukumlima features giant intelligent earthworms who live in an extinct volcano and collect "elephant mice".
 The Septimus Heap novel Flyte introduces creatures known as Landwyrms, worm-like creatures with deadly tails that secrete acid.
 Chaol Westfall, a character from Throne of Glass.
 Walter the Worm, a worm which makes minor/cameo appearances in various of the Mr. Men books, appearing in the background of almost all of them.  Not named as Walter until latter-day additions to the Mr. Men canon. He later received his own book in the series.
 Earthworm, in Roald Dahl's James and the Giant Peach book.
 The Middengard Wyrm (A Court of Thorns and Roses) is a gigantic, blind worm monster that navigates by scent, and is described as being pinkish-brown and having an enormous mouth filled with rows of sharp teeth. It is killed by the main character of the series, Feyre, who evades its senses by covering herself in mud, and then lures it into a trap made of the bones of its previous victims.
Superworm children's book  by British author Julia Donaldson illustrated by Axel Scheffler.

Comics
 Gary Larson narrates the adventures of a nuclear worm family in his 1998 There's a Hair in My Dirt: A Worm's Story.
 Glupy, a wurm in a children's comics series, drawn by Juan Díaz Rodriguez.
 Kulgude, a wurm who can locate treasure. Side character in Raymond Macherot's Sibylline.
 Quentin the lugworm in the British comic strip Ollie and Quentin by Piers Baker.
 Ko Rocks, a string worm in the comic strip "Cricket's Rock" by Cricket's Rocks.
 Mr. Wriggly is a hidden character in every "Rabbits Against Magic" strip by Jonathan Lemon.
 Mister Mind is a fictional worm supervillain appearing in American comic books published by DC Comics who was created by Otto Binder and C. C. Beck for Fawcett Comics.
 George, a talking earthworm, and Marty, a talking inchworm, both appearing in the marginal comics in Cricket (magazine).

Television, music, and film
 Lowly Worm is a fictional character created by Richard Scarry, and is a main character in the animated series The Busy World of Richard Scarry.
 In the Star Wars universe, space slugs, also called exogorths or "giant asteroid worms", are silicon-based gastropods, capable of surviving in a vacuum. First seen in The Empire Strikes Back.
 The Graboids in the Tremors films and television series.
 Jeff, the giant subway worm in the film Men in Black II.
 The ghost-eating sandworms in the film Beetlejuice.
 Benny Worm, a character from the 2018 music video "It's Benny Worm" created by Jack Stauber
 A family of worms in Jim Davis' comic strip U.S. Acres
 Phish performed a version of the song "Swingtown" in Amsterdam, about giant worms in the city's sewers, known as "Wormtown".
 "Inchworm", a song first recorded by Danny Kaye and since covered by several other artists, asks an inchworm to appreciate the beauty of marigolds rather than measuring their length.
 The giant worm-demon in "Beneath You", a 7th-season episode of Buffy the Vampire Slayer
 The giant flukeworm/human hybrid in "The Host", a 2nd-season episode of The X-Files
 A giant maggot/worm in the cult film Galaxy of Terror.
 "Just a worm" living in the walls of the outer Labyrinth in the Jim Henson movie of the same name.
 Regulan bloodworms are a species in the Star Trek universe.
 In the 2005 film King Kong, a giant bloodworm-like predator called the carnictis lives in the rents and chasms of Skull Island. They grow to be 7–13 feet long, and they kill a character named Lumpy in the film.
 In the Alien series, Alien Chestbursters are Xenomorph larvae that incubate within a human host and rip out of the chest cavity when partially mature.
 The giant flesh-eating worms from pre-Cambrian times in the TV series Primeval. These worms live on sulphur gases which come from the anomaly; oxygen is poison for them.
 Doctor Worm, the titular character in the They Might Be Giants song, a worm that can play the drums. Not a real doctor. Featured on Nickelodeon's Kablam
 In the Worms series of video games, Boggy B, Spadge, and Clagnut are named characters who appear in title songs and the like.
 Alaskan Bull Worm from the television show SpongeBob SquarePants.
 The Bookworm, a supporting character in Warner Brothers' Sniffles cartoons.
 The Bookworm, a character Spider-Man fought in an episode of the 1970s PBS TV series The Electric Company.
 Bookworm, supporting character on the cartoon show Tiny Toon Adventures.
 The Bookworm, characters in various children's reading programs.
 Boreworms, an (unseen) animal used as an implement of torture in the movie Flash Gordon.
 Evil Jim, Earthworm Jim's evil Doppelgänger from the Earthworm Jim TV series.
 Glo Worm, plush stuffed toys for children.
 The Slurm Queen from Futurama, the only source of the Slurm brand of soda.
 Mr. Mind, the super-intelligent nemesis of DC's Captain Marvel character appears in the middle of the closing credits of Shazam! (film).
 Slimey, pet of Sesame Street Oscar the Grouch.
 Sherman, a worm who appears in some episodes of The Backyardigans.
 Lazy Jay Ranch's worms in Rocky and Bullwinkle.
 The "Worm That Doth Corrupt" from Jerusalem's Lot by Stephen King.
 A giant worm was the monster in a What's New, Scooby-Doo? episode.
 A giant worm was in an episode of Timon and Pumbaa.
 The Dark One Worm, from Super Robot Monkey Team Hyperforce Go!.
.
 The Sweet Worm from Hamtaro (Japanese "Hamu Hamu Paradai~chu!" season), a giant worm who ate the sweets in Sweet Paradise, then went through metamorphosis and turned into Sweet Butterfly.
 Winny the Worm, mascot of Whiteworms Studios and main character in a series of stop-motion short films.
 Jane Prentiss, a woman whose body hosts a large colony of worms, and is the main antagonist from season one of the horror anthology podcast The Magnus Archives.
 Turner the Worm, a comic strip written by Paul Rose for the now-defunct UK Teletext service.
 Mr. Dinkles from the trolls series.
 Metal sandworm, more likely giant whirling tunneling tornadoes of metallic scrap, in the film Vexille.
 Guph's Giant Dirt-Devouring Worm from the 1986 TV series The Wonderful Wizard of Oz.
 Memory worm from the Doctor Who episode "The Snowmen".
 Shelby, the worm who lives in Jake's violin in Adventure Time.
Kent, Shelby’s little brother in Adventure Time.
The king worm who traps Finn in a dream from Adventure Time.
 Trill symbionts are worm like aliens in Star Trek.
 In the It's Always Sunny in Philadelphia episode, 'The Gang Tends Bar,' Frank intentionally gives himself a tapeworm he called Jerry.
 Earthworm, in Roald Dahl's James and the Giant Peach book.
 The worm in Corpse Bride.

Role-playing games
 Purple worms, from Dungeons & Dragons.
All enemies, from board game Terror Below.

Video games
Amorbis, Sandigger, and Bomb Guardian enemies from Metroid Prime 2: Echoes.
Thresher Maw, an alien earthworm from the Mass Effect trilogy.
Annelids, from System Shock 2.
Boggy B., from Worms (series).
Boreworms, from Splatterhouse.
Burrow Beast, a man-eating worm weapon from Destroy All Humans! 2.
 Earthworm Jim, the protagonist of the video game series with the same name.
Earthworm Kim, the female version of Jim from Earthworm Jim 3D.
Grimmy, from Fat Worm Blows a Sparky.
Long and purple worms, from NetHack.
Mindworms, from Sid Meier's Alpha Centauri.
Moldorm, from The Legend of Zelda and its sequels.
Multiworms and hyperworms, from X-COM: Apocalypse.
The Pit Worm and Geneworm from Half-Life: Opposing Force.
Sandworms, from the Dune computer and video games.
Sandworms, from the Diablo I, Diablo II, and Diablo III computer and video games.
Sandworms, from the Final Fantasy series.
Tapeworm Slim, a new character planned to be in the cancelled Earthworm Jim PSP.
Burrowers and Dune Worms (possibly Young Burrowers) from the WarCraft series.
The eponymous worms from the Worms series.
The various types of Worms in Guildwars.
 Zerg larvae, Nydus worms, and Cerebrates from StarCraft.
Rockworms and the Riftworm from Gears of War 2.
Molgera, a boss from The Legend of Zelda: The Wind Waker.
Worm, referring to various types of creatures in the Monster Rancher series.
Magmaw, a boss from World of Warcraft: Cataclysm.
The Neurax Worm, a plague type from Plague Inc. and Plague Inc. Evolved.
Baron Nashor, a giant worm from League of Legends.
Death Worm, the protagonist from the smartphone game of the same name.
Split Worm, an enormous worm that appears in Silent Hill 3.
Greedy Worm, a creature from Silent Hill 4: The Room & The Arcade.
Greedy Worm, an enemy in Crash Twinsanity.
 Graboid, from the computer game Dirt Dragons.
 Xol, a worm god in Destiny 2.
The Magma Worm, a giant serpent creature made of magma from Risk of Rain and Risk of Rain 2.
The Starworm, a giant lindwurm-like mecha and worshipped God, from Iconoclasts.
The Pale King, from Hollow Knight, is reborn from a giant wormlike creature known as Wyrm.
Bardoon, a NPC from Hollow Knight which is referred to in the game files as a caterpillar.
The Carthus Sand Worm is a miniboss in Dark Souls III.
Grove Worm, an enemy from Spyro.
The Eater Of Worlds, a boss in Terraria.
The Crystal Worm Mother, a boss in Realm of the Mad God.
The Lekgolo, a species of colonial worms which operate machinery as a hive, from the Halo franchise.

References

Worms